Dale's Code (the Lawes Divine, Morall, and Martial, also known as the laws of 1612) is a code enacted in 1612 by the Deputy Governor of Virginia Thomas Dale. The code, among other things, created a rather authoritarian system of government for the Colony of Virginia. It established a "single ruling group" that "held tight control of the colony." The word "martial", contained in Dale's Code, refers to the duties of soldiers, while the terms "divine" and "morall" relate to crime and punishment. The code prescribed capital punishment for any colonist who endangered the life of the colony by theft or other crimes. 

Dale's Code remained in force until 1618. Four centuries later, one scholar came up with a theory that it strongly influenced the justice system for decades afterwards, particularly in the governing and punishment of slaves. In the "Calendar of State Papers Colonial, America and West Indies: Volume 1, 1574-1660," the following unattributed commentary on the code is present:

References

External links
Dale's Code at the Columbia Law School
Simplified version of Dale's Code at the Jamestown Settlement & Yorktown Victory Center

James River (Virginia)
1612 in law